Anirudh Lal Nagar (4 October 1930 – 4 February 2014) was an Indian econometrician notable for his work on the finite-sample inference in econometrics.

Born in Allahabad, Nagar earned a Master's in statistics from Lucknow University in 1951, and a Ph.D. in Economics from what is now Erasmus University Rotterdam under the supervision of Henri Theil. He died on 4 February 2014, in Pune.

References 

1930 births
2014 deaths
Indian statisticians
20th-century Indian economists
University of Lucknow alumni
Erasmus University Rotterdam alumni
Fellows of the Econometric Society